Casino Tycoon is a tycoon type of game where players aspire from a small unknown to a tycoon in the casino business.

Game features 
This game features characters such as Marlon Brando from The Godfather. One mission is for players to become the first casino to attain Five-star rating or make 50,000 pounds. Players control all aspects of the casino, including hiring staff, buying casinos, and managing the day-to-day operations. The basic aim of the game is to own and manage a casino.

Reception 

Casino Tycoon received mixed to negative reviews from critics upon release. On Metacritic, the game holds a score of 52/100 based on 4 reviews, indicating "mixed or average reviews".

Staci Krause of IGN rated it 6.2/10 and wrote that the game, while initially fun, becomes too easy to have long-term entertainment value.

References 

2001 video games
Casino video games
Video games developed in the United States
Windows games
Windows-only games
Business simulation games
Cat Daddy Games games
Single-player video games